Daniel Dyke (died 1614) was an English academic, a Puritan of the reign of James I.

Life
He was born at Hempstead, Essex, where his father was a minister and had been silenced for nonconformity. He proceeded B.A. at St John's College, Cambridge in 1595–6, and M.A. at Sidney Sussex College in 1599. He became fellow of Sidney in 1606, when or soon after he proceeded B.D.

Works
Jeremiah Dyke, among those of the ministers who subscribed the Book of Discipline, was his brother, and edited all Daniel Dyke's works for publication.

Dyke wrote: 
 ‘The Mystery of Self-deceiving,’ 1615. 
 ‘Certaine comfortable Sermons vpon the 124 Psalme,’ 1616. 
 ‘Six Evangelical Histories: of Water turned into Wine, of the Temple's Purgation, of Christ and Nicodemus, of John's last Testimony, of Christ and the Woman of Samaria, of the Ruler's Son's Healing,’ 1617. 
 ‘Exposition upon Philemon and the School of Affliction,’ 1618. 
 ‘Two Treatises: The one, of Repentance; the other, of Christ's Temptations.’

His works were collected and published by his brother in two volumes in 1635.

References

Notes

External links

Attribution

Year of birth missing
1614 deaths
17th-century English Puritans
Fellows of Sidney Sussex College, Cambridge
English Calvinist and Reformed theologians
17th-century Calvinist and Reformed theologians